Caulfield  may refer to:

Places
Caulfield, Victoria, suburb in Melbourne, Australia
Electoral district of Caulfield, a state electoral district in Victoria, Australia
Caulfield, Missouri, a community in Missouri
Castlecaulfield, a village in County Tyrone, Northern Ireland
Castle Caulfield, a ruined house in Castlecaulfield

People
Caulfield (surname), people with the surname Caulfield

Fictional characters
Holden Caulfield, fictional character in The Catcher in the Rye
Caulfield, eight-year-old character in the comic strip Frazz
Max Caulfield, the protagonist of the 2015 video game Life Is Strange

Facilities and structures
Caulfield Racecourse, horse-racing venue
Caulfield Grammar School, independent school in Victoria, Australia
Caulfield railway station, Melbourne

Other
Caulfield Cup, horse race
The Caulfields, 1990s rock group from the Philadelphia area

See also

Caulfeild (disambiguation)
Caufield, a surname